Holocryptis erubescens is a moth of the family Noctuidae first described by George Hampson in 1893. It is found in Sri Lanka, Thailand and Japan.

Forewings brownish. There is a light yellow-brown oblique streak which runs from the center of the leading edge to the outer edge. Small black spots are present near the trailing edge angle.

References

Moths of Asia
Moths described in 1893
Acontiinae